Balachandran Prabhakaran (1 October 1996 – 19 May 2009) was the third child of Velupillai Prabhakaran, the founder and leader of the Liberation Tigers of Tamil Eelam movement.

He was killed by Sri Lanka forces after surrendering during the final phase of the Sri Lankan Civil War in May 2009. The Sri Lankan military claims he was killed in cross fire during a battle. In 2013, leaked images showed Balachandran Prabhakaran, apparently in the custody of the Sri Lankan military. Subsequent images showed him dead, having been shot up to five times in the chest.

According to Callum Macrae, director of the documentary No Fire Zone: "The new photographs are enormously important evidentially because they appear to rule out any suggestion that Balachandran was killed in cross-fire or during a battle. They show he was held, and even given a snack, before being taken and executed in cold blood."

The group Journalists for Democracy in Sri Lanka has stated that the images are proof the child was executed soon after being captured.

References

2009 deaths
Sri Lankan murder victims
Human rights abuses in Sri Lanka
People murdered in Sri Lanka
Tamil Eelam
Sri Lankan Tamil people
1996 births